Northamptonshire County Cricket Club was established on 31 July 1878. The county entered the Minor Counties Championship in 1895 and competed in the competition until 1904, after which it was elevated to first-class status for the 1905 season. It has since played first-class cricket from 1905, List A cricket from 1963 and Twenty20 cricket from 2003, using a different number of home grounds during that time. The County Ground in Northampton has played host to the club's first home fixtures in all three formats of the game; in first-class cricket in 1905 against Leicestershire; in List A cricket in 1963 against Warwickshire; and in Twenty20 cricket against Somerset in 2003. Northamptonshire have played home matches at sixteen grounds, but have played the majority of their home fixtures at the County Ground, which has also held One Day Internationals.

The sixteen grounds that Northamptonshire have used for home matches since 1895 are listed below, with statistics complete through to the end of the 2014 season.

Grounds

Minor county
Below is a complete list of grounds used by Northamptonshire County Cricket Club in Minor Counties Championship matches before its elevation to first-class status in 1905.

First-class county
Below is a complete list of grounds used by Northamptonshire County Cricket Club in first-class, List A and Twenty20 matches following its elevation to first-class status in 1905.

Notes

References

Northamptonshire County Cricket Club
Cricket grounds in Northamptonshire
Northamptonshire
Northamptonshire-related lists